is an American high school on Kadena Air Base in Okinawa City, Okinawa Prefecture, Japan, and is administered by the Department of Defense Education Activity. Opened in 1981, the school is for English-speaking American military subordinates. It is run under the supervision of the Okinawa Department of Defense Dependents Schools District.

Campus
The school is located near the east entrance of Gate 5 with Kadena Middle School on the west side of the Gate.  The school has a single main building where most classes and activities are held. Due to a large number of students, an additional 2-story building, referred to as "The Annex", was added. The school pool was filled in due to a bad foundation, and the pool house was subsequently given to the school's AFJROTC unit.

History
When opened in 1981, it included grade levels 7–12, as there were no middle schools at the time.  A middle school for grades 7 and 8 was built across the street in 1990 with access via a bridge, and later included grade 6.

The first graduating class was 1982 and had 35 graduates.

According to Pacific Stars and Stripes, In December 1996, Vice Principle James Feller resigned and fled Okinawa after learning he was being investigated for taking sexually suggestive photographs, including partially nude photos, of female students after learning he had been suspended and slated for removal. He left Okinawa without the knowledge of local authorities, and before they could prevent him from international travel. Japanese investigators were brought in to investigate his home outside the military base and to decide if charges should be brought against him. The conclusion of the investigation led Japanese officials to believe that they did not have the jurisdiction to prosecute Feller, as all involved were Americans, and Feller had fled back to America.  It is unclear why American military police did not continue their investigation into Feller.

Sports
The school mascot is the Panther and the colors are black and gold.

The school's main rivals are Kubasaki High School and Okinawa Christian School International.

The school has teams in baseball, softball, tennis, golf, volleyball, cheer, basketball, soccer, football, wrestling, cross country, and track.

Recognition
In the 2009–2010 season, Kadena beat Seoul American for the Far East Title 44–0.

Kadena High School's JA-932 Air Force JROTC unit competed in the first DODEA Far East JROTC marksmanship competition involving Air Force cadets, in December, 2011, where one Kadena cadet won a novice 3rd place overall medal.

Kadena High School hosted the 2012 DODEA Far East JROTC drill competition in March 2012. They also hosted it in March 2014, getting 1st place in Overall, Armed Exhibition, Armed Regulations, and Unarmed Regulations, and also getting 2nd place in Unarmed Exhibition and Color Guard. This was their first time winning the competition.

Kadena High School's Honors 10 Literature and 12 English teacher, Sarah McKinney was awarded the Okinawa District "Teacher of the Year" award by the Department of Defense Education Activity DODEA .

See also

 List of Japanese international schools in the United States
 Americans in Japan

References

External links 

 
 Impact Student Ministry on Kadena

High schools in Okinawa Prefecture
Educational institutions established in 1981
Schools in Okinawa Prefecture
American international schools in Japan
Department of Defense Education Activity
1981 establishments in Japan